The Dendryphantina are a subtribe of jumping spiders that occur mainly in the New World. The subtribe was first defined by Anton Menge in 1879 as Dendryphantidae. Females of the subtribe generally show paired spots on the abdomen, and the males often have enlarged chelicerae. Females in this subtribe typically have S-shaped epigynal openings.

Taxonomy
As of 2015, Dendryphantina includes the following genera:
 Alcmena C. L. Koch, 1846 — South America to Mexico
 Anokopsis Bauab & Soares, 1980 — Brazil
 Anicius Chamberlin, 1925 — Mexico
 Ashtabula Peckham & Peckham, 1894 — Brazil to Panama
 Avitus Peckham & Peckham, 1896 — Argentina to Panama, Jamaica
 Bagheera Peckham & Peckham, 1896 — Guatemala to Mexico
 Beata Peckham & Peckham, 1895 — South America, Madagascar
 Bellota Peckham & Peckham, 1892 — Americas, Pakistan
 Bryantella Chickering, 1946 — Panama to Argentina
 Cerionesta Simon, 1901 — Guyana, St. Vincent
 Chirothecia Taczanowski, 1878 — South America
 Dendryphantes C. L. Koch, 1837 — Eurasia, Africa, Americas
 Donaldius Chickering, 1946 — Panama
 Eris C. L. Koch, 1846 — Alaska to Ecuador
 Fritzia O. P.-Cambridge, 1879 — Brazil, Argentina
 Gastromicans Mello-Leitão, 1917 — South, Central America
 Ghelna Maddison, 1996 — North America
 Hentzia Marx, 1883 — Americas
 Lurio Simon, 1901 — South America
 Mabellina Chickering, 1946 — Panama
 Macaroeris Wunderlich, 1992 — Eurasia
 Mburuvicha Scioscia, 1993 — Argentina
 Messua Peckham & Peckham, 1896 — Central America
 Metaphidippus F. O. P-Cambridge, 1901 — Americas
 Mirandia Badcock, 1932 — Paraguay
 Monaga Chickering, 1946 — Panama
 Nagaina Peckham & Peckham, 1896 — South America to Mexico
 Naubolus Simon, 1901 — South America
 Osericta Simon, 1901 — Peru, Brazil
 Paradamoetas Peckham & Peckham, 1885 — Canada to Panama
 Paraphidippus F. O. P.-Cambridge, 1901 — USA to Panama
 Parnaenus Peckham & Peckham, 1896 — Central, South America
 Pelegrina Franganillo, 1930 — Canada to Panama
 Phanias F. O. P.-Cambridge, 1901 — USA to El Salvador, Galapagos
 Phidippus C. L. Koch, 1846 — North America
 Planiemen Wesołowska & van Harten, 2007 — Yemen
 Poultonella Peckham & Peckham, 1909 — USA
 Pseudofluda Mello-Leitão, 1928 — Brazil
 Pseudopartona Caporiacco, 1954 — French Guiana
 Rhene Thorell, 1869 — Asia, Africa, South America
 Rhetenor Simon, 1902 — USA, Mexico, Brazil
 Rudra Peckham & Peckham, 1885 — South America to Guatemala
 Sassacus Peckham & Peckham, 1895 — Americas
 Sebastira Simon, 1901 — Venezuela, Panama
 Selimus Peckham & Peckham, 1901 — Brazil
 Semora Peckham & Peckham, 1892 — South America
 Tacuna Peckham & Peckham, 1901 — Brazil, Argentina
 Terralonus Maddison, 1996 — USA
 Thammaca Simon, 1902 — Peru, Brazil
 Tulpius Peckham & Peckham, 1896 — Brazil, Guatemala
 Tutelina Simon, 1901 — Canada to Ecuador
 Tuvaphantes Logunov, 1993 — Russia
 Uluella Chickering, 1946 — Panama
 Xuriella Wesołowska & Russell-Smith, 2000 — Tanzania, Yemen
 Zeuxippus Thorell, 1891 — Asia
 Zygoballus Peckham & Peckham, 1885 — Americas

References

Salticidae
Animal subtribes